Eozoön canadense (literally, "dawn animal of Canada") is a pseudofossil.

John William Dawson described the banded structures of coarsely crystalline calcite and serpentine as a gigantic Foraminifera, making it the oldest known fossil . It was found in Precambrian metamorphosed limestone of Canada, at Côte St. Pierre near Grenville (Quebec) in 1863. It was later found in several other localities. Dawson called it "one of the brightest gems in the scientific crown of the Geological Survey of Canada". In 1894, it was shown that the place where it was found was associated with metamorphism.

Similar Eozoön structures were subsequently found in metamorphosed limestone blocks erupted from Mount Vesuvius, where high-temperature physical and chemical processes were responsible for their formation .

References
 
 
 
 

Pseudofossils
Precambrian fossils
Fossils of Canada
Fossils of Italy
Precambrian Canada
Precambrian Europe
Paleontology in Quebec
Metamorphic rocks